Rabbi Benjamin of Lida (Hebrew: הרב בנימין מלידא ;  – 1862) was a 19th-century Hasidic rabbi and kabbalist who served as the first Hasidic rabbi of Lida, Belarus.

Biography  
R. Benjamin was born around 1800 in Belarus. In his early years, he became a disciple of R. Solomon Hayyim Perlow (founder of Koidanover Hasidism) and under the instruction of R. Solomon, he brought Koidanover Hasidism to Lida, establishing a Hasidic community in 1833, which had a synagogue and yeshiva. In 1854, R. Benjamin became engrossed in a controversy with the city's Misnagdic Chief Rabbi, R. Elijah Schik, which ultimately resulted in R. Elijah leaving Lida and being replaced by R. Mordecai Meltzer. R. Benjamin was a renowned miracle maker and kabbalist, under whose leadership, the city's Hasidic community grew exponentially. R. Benjamin died in 1862.

References 

1800 births
1862 deaths
Hasidic rabbis
Belarusian rabbis
19th-century rabbis from the Russian Empire
Year of birth uncertain